Fábio André da Silva Ferraz (born 14 July 1985), commonly known as Tiquinho, is a Portuguese-Angolan professional footballer who plays as a right winger.

Club career
Tiquinho was born in Sesimbra, Setúbal District. After unsuccessfully emerging through S.L. Benfica's youth system the 19-year-old signed for C.S. Marítimo but, during his three-year spell in Madeira, he played almost exclusively with the reserves in the third division, only being called to the first team's substitutes bench on two occasions.

In the summer of 2007, Tiquinho moved to Cyprus, going on to remain in the country for the following three years in representation of AEL Limassol, Anorthosis Famagusta FC – no official games – AEK Larnaca FC and AEP Paphos FC.  He then went on to play in Spain, Angola and ended his career in Moura, which competes in Campeonato de Portugal, the third-level of Portuguese football.

Tiquinho is international for the academy teams of Portugal, and for the Angola national football team.

References

External links

1985 births
Living people
People from Sesimbra
Portuguese footballers
Angolan footballers
Association football wingers
Segunda Divisão players
G.D. Sesimbra footballers
S.L. Benfica footballers
C.S. Marítimo players
Cypriot First Division players
AEL Limassol players
Anorthosis Famagusta F.C. players
AEK Larnaca FC players
AEP Paphos FC players
Segunda División B players
UD Alzira footballers
Girabola players
G.D. Interclube players
Portugal youth international footballers
Angola international footballers
Portuguese expatriate footballers
Angolan expatriate footballers
Expatriate footballers in Cyprus
Expatriate footballers in Spain
Portuguese expatriate sportspeople in Cyprus
Sportspeople from Setúbal District